Johann Georg Meusel (17 March 1743 – 19 September 1820) was a German bibliographer, lexicographer and historian.

Meusel was born in Eyrichshof. From 1764 he studied history and philology at the University of Göttingen, where his instructors included Christian Gottlob Heyne, Johann Christoph Gatterer, Gottfried Achenwall, Georg Christoph Hamberger and Christian Adolph Klotz, the latter of which he followed to the University of Halle in 1766. In 1768 he was appointed professor of history at the University of Erfurt, where his colleagues included Karl Friedrich Bahrdt and Christoph Martin Wieland. From 1779 up to the time of his death in Erlangen, he was a professor of history at the University of Erlangen.

Selected works 
  (6 volumes, 1778–80) – Latest literature of history. 
  (30 issues, 1779–87) – Miscellaneous artistic subject matter.
 ; a revision of Burkhard Gotthelf Struve's work (11 volumes, 1782–1804).
 , with Georg Christoph Hamberger (5th edition, 23 volumes; 1796–1834) – The learned Germany, or, encyclopaedia of living German writers. 
  (3 parts, 1799–1800) – Guide to the history of scholarship.
  (15 volumes, 1802–16) – Encyclopaedia of German writers who died from 1750 to 1800.
  (4th edition, 1817) – Textbook of statistics.

Further reading 
 (de) Hans-Otto Keunecke: Johann Georg Meusel (1743–1820). In: Fränkische Lebensbilder. Bd. 17 (1998), S. 111–128.
(de) Werner Raupp: MEUSEL, Johann Georg. In: Biographisch-Bibliographisches Kirchenlexikon (BBKL). Band 26, Bautz, Nordhausen 2006, Sp. 966–976 (with detailed Bibliogr.)
(en) Werner Raupp: Meusel, Johann Georg (1743–1820). In: Heiner F. Klemme und Manfred Kuehn (Hrsg.): The Dictionary of Eighteenth-Century German Philosophers. Bd. 2, London/New York 2010, S. 807–809.

References 

1743 births
1820 deaths
People from Haßberge (district)
Academic staff of the University of Erfurt
Academic staff of the University of Erlangen-Nuremberg
University of Göttingen alumni
German bibliographers
German lexicographers
19th-century German historians